Gadget Man (previously Stephen Fry: Gadget Man) is a British television series, which aired from 19 November 2012 to 22 June 2015 on Channel 4 and was presented by Stephen Fry in the first series and Richard Ayoade in the remaining three. Each episode presented a variety of innovative products related to the episode's theme. The series was mainly filmed in and around The Lime Works, a 1930s art deco converted water tower in Norton, Kent. Since the Stephen Fry: Gadget Man series was first broadcast, the franchise has also been expanded by Channel 4/North One to include Travel Man with Ayoade and current presenter Joe Lycett, and new commission Hobby Man, with Alex Brooker from Channel 4's Friday night comedy show The Last Leg.

Episodes

Series overview

Series 1 (2012)

Series 2 (2013)

Series 3 (2014)

Series 4 (2015)

References

External links
 
 

2012 British television series debuts
2015 British television series endings
Channel 4 original programming
English-language television shows
Television series by All3Media
British non-fiction television series